Ettore Castaldi (16 December 16, 1877 – 16 August 1956) was an Italian painter, painting mainly outdoor landscapes.

Biography
He was born in Livorno; orphaned at a young age, he was raised by uncle, and put to manual work in the port. This rough environment failed to lessen his vocation for art, encourage by his encounters with the Labronico painters, including Corrado Michelozzi and Adriano Baracchini Caputi, at the Caffè Bardi.

He made many frescoes in the churches of the Garfagnana. In 1920 signed the Declaration of Tribute to Puccini, published by the Artistic Livorno after the split which gave rise to the establishment of Gruppo Labronico.

As an anarchist sympathizer, in 1924 he went into exile in Santos, Brazil. He remained in touch with family, friends, and painters of Livorno, but spent the war in Brazil, and chose not to return to Italy. He died in Santos, Brazil, at 16 August 1956.

In 2013, a portrait of Castaldi painted by Corrado Michelozzi was donated to the Pinacoteca Carlo Servolini.

References

1877 births
1956 deaths
19th-century Italian painters
Italian male painters
20th-century Italian painters
20th-century Italian male artists
People from Livorno
Painters from Tuscany
20th-century Brazilian painters
20th-century Brazilian male artists
Italian landscape painters
Italian emigrants to Brazil
19th-century Italian male artists

Gruppo Labronico